The Proctor House at 507 N. Glass in Victoria, Texas was built in approximately 1900.  It was designed by Jules Leffland and was built in 1900.  The listing included two contributing buildings.

It is an "understated Neoclassical Revival styled dwelling" designed by architect Jules Leffland for the Venable Bland Proctor family.  Venable Proctor was a lawyer in the law firm of Proctor, Vandenberge, Grain and Mitchell for many years.  A two-story frame carriage house with a cupola is a second contributing building on the property.

It was listed on the NRHP as part of a study which listed numerous historic resources in the Victoria area.

See also

National Register of Historic Places listings in Victoria County, Texas
Recorded Texas Historic Landmarks in Victoria County

References

Houses on the National Register of Historic Places in Texas
Colonial Revival architecture in Texas
Houses completed in 1900
Houses in Victoria, Texas
National Register of Historic Places in Victoria, Texas
Recorded Texas Historic Landmarks